Dawid Pietrzyński (born 22 July 1991) is a Polish former competitive ice dancer. Competing in partnership with Justyna Plutowska, he qualified for the final segment at the 2010 World Junior Championships.

Career 
Early in his career, Pietrzyński skated with Miłosława Zaleska. The two won the novice bronze medal at the 2006 Polish Championships.

Pietrzyński teamed up with Justyna Plutowska in 2006. The duo won the junior title at the 2009 Polish Championships and were sent to the 2009 World Junior Championships in Sofia, Bulgaria. They ranked 25th in the compulsory dance and 26th in the original dance, which did not allow them to advance to the final segment.

The following season, Plutowska/Pietrzyński repeated as national junior champions and were assigned to the 2010 World Junior Championships in The Hague, Netherlands. Ranked 18th in both the compulsory and original dances, they qualified to the free dance and finished 20th overall. They were coached by Mirosław Plutowski in Gdańsk.

In the 2010–11 season, Plutowska/Pietrzyński moved up to the senior level and took the silver medal at the Polish Championships, behind Alexandra Zvorigina / Maciej Bernadowski. They made no senior international appearances.

Programs
With Plutowska

Competitive highlights
JGP: Junior Grand Prix

With Plutowska

With Zaleska

References

External links 

 
 Justyna Plutowska / Dawid Pietrzyński at the Polish Figure Skating Association
 Miłosława Zaleska / Dawid Pietrzyński at the Polish Figure Skating Association
 Justyna Plutowska / Dawid Pietrzyński at tracings.net
 Miłosława Zaleska / Dawid Pietrzyński at tracings.net
 Dawid Pietrzyński at Figure Skating Online

Polish male ice dancers
1991 births
Living people
Sportspeople from Gdańsk